Tina Shagufta Munir Kornmo (born 1 May 1968) is a Norwegian physician and politician for the Liberal Party.

She served as a deputy representative to the Parliament of Norway from Oslo during the term 2017–2021. Born in Lahore, she migrated to Norway at the age of four and eventually married a Norwegian. She joined the Liberal Party in 2005, and had a nondescript political career prior to 2017, having sat two years as a deputy representative to Frogner borough council. She is a chief physician at Bærum Hospital. A liberal Muslim, she chaired the NGO "Likestilling, integrering, mangfold."

References

1968 births
Living people
Pakistani emigrants to Norway
Members of the Storting
Liberal Party (Norway) politicians
Politicians from Oslo
Norwegian women in politics
20th-century Norwegian physicians
Norwegian Muslims
Women members of the Storting